Sir Ernest Hall  (born 19 March 1930) is an English businessman, known for his restoration of Dean Clough Mills, Halifax; pianist, and composer.

Early life and education

Hall was born in Bolton, Lancashire in 1930. He was educated at Bolton College Grammar School and the Royal College of Music.

Career

Hall made his first fortune in textiles. He then sold real estate through the Mountleigh Group. In 1983, Hall sold his company for £40 million and then invested £20 million in the Dean Clough former carpet factory site.
In 1983, he led a consortium which purchased a disused carpet mill complex, Dean Clough Mills, and converted it into an arts, business, design and education complex. While in his 70s, he recorded the complete piano works of Frédéric Chopin.

He was appointed an Officer of the Order of the British Empire (OBE) in the 1986 Birthday Honours and knighted in the 1993 Birthday Honours.

Show business

He appeared as a castaway on the BBC Radio 4 programme Desert Island Discs on 26 April 1998, and on the Radio 3 programme Private Passions on 18 September 2005.

Residence

Hall has homes in Lanzarote and in France.

Autobiography

His autobiography, How to Be A Failure and Succeed, was published in 2008.

Personal life

In 1951, Hall married firstly June Annable (died 1994), and had two sons and two daughters. He married secondly in 1975 Sarah Wellby, with whom he has a third son.

In 2009, he revealed that he was in a romantic relationship with his long-time friend, the cookery writer Prue Leith.

Bibliography

References 

1930 births
Living people
People from Bolton
English businesspeople
English classical pianists
Knights Bachelor
Officers of the Order of the British Empire
21st-century classical pianists